This article details the qualification phase for the 1984 AFC Asian Cup held in Singapore between 1 and 16 December.

Groups

 * Withdrew
 ** Moved to Group 3
  qualified as defending champions
  qualified as host

Qualification

Group 1 
All matches played in Indonesia.

Additional playoff (purpose unclear)

Group 2 
All matches played in Saudi Arabia.

Group 3 
All matches played in India.

Group 4 
All matches played in China.

Qualified teams

Goal scorers 
Note : Some of the goals which are not recorded are not listed here.

9 Goals
 Nasser Mohammadkhani

6 Goals
 Hamid Alidoosti
 Park Sung-hwa
 Zhao Dayu

4 Goals
 Sain Irmis

3 Goals
 Chalit
 Li Hui
 Sheikh Mohammad Aslam

2 Goals
 Piyapong Pue-On
 Thanis Areesngarkul
 Khandoker Wasim Iqbal
 Elmer Bedia
 Nabil El-Sibai
 Abdul Kader Kardaghli
 Reza Ahadi
 Wang Seon-je
 Shabbir Ali
 Li Huayun
 Yang Zhaohui

1 Goal
 Danny Bolung
 Noah Meriem
 Marwan Madarati
 Hassan
 Fouad Aziz
 Kazi Jashimuddin
 Me'mar
 Hamid Derakhshan
 Arabshai
 Mokhtarifar
 Chalee Pirom
 Chalor Hongkajohn
 Mariano Araneta
 Chung Hae-won
 Lee Tae-ho
 Choi Sang-hook
 Park Chang-seon
 Narender Thapa
 Bikash Panji
 Zainal Abidin
 Awad
 Lai Wing-Cheong
 Zuo Shusheng
 Gu Guangming
 Mohammed Al-Sowaidi
 Man'a Al-Barshi
 Mohammed Al-Mohanadi

References

External links
Morrison, Neil; Panahi, Majeed; Veroeveren, Pieter. "Asian Nations Cup 1984". RSSSF.
"India withdraw pull-out threat"

The Straits Times, 22 March 1983, Page 35

https://eresources.nlb.gov.sg/newspapers/Digitised/Article/straitstimes19830322-1.2.109.aspx

"It's Singapore all the way"

The Straits Times, 3 July 1983, Page 31

https://eresources.nlb.gov.sg/newspapers/Digitised/Article/straitstimes19830703-1.2.86.aspx

AFC Asian Cup qualification
AFC Asian Cup qualification
AFC Asian Cup qualification
AFC Asian Cup qualification
Q
AFC Asian Cup qualification